Malacanthus brevirostris, the quakerfish, flagtail blanquillo, false whiting or stripetail tilefish,  is a species of marine ray-finned fish, a tilefish belonging to the family Malacanthidae. It has a wide Indo-Pacific distribution.

Description
Malacanthus brevirostris has a long and slender body, with a rounded head and a large, sharp spine in the centre of the gill cover. It has an overall colour of greyish with a yellow hue on the head. The back is marked within distinct chevron-shaped bars. There are two convergent black stripes, one each on the upper and lower lobes of the caudal fin. There are 1-4 spines and 52-56 soft rays in the dorsal fin while the anal fin contains a single spine and 46-55 soft rays.

Distribution
Malacanthus brevirostris has a wide distribution in the Indian and Pacific Oceans. It ranges from the Red Sea and the eastern coast of Africa to Hawaii and on to the western coasts of Panama and Colombia, extending north to Japan and south to the Austral Islands and Lord Howe Island. In the eastern Pacific it is also found at the French territory of Clipperton Island, Malpelo Island in Colombia, the Galápagos Islands of Ecuador and Costa Rica’s Cocos Island.

Habitat and biology
They are largely found in barren and open areas of outer reef slope where they are typically encountered in pairs living on sand in a hole that they have excavated. When threatened, they take refuge into their burrow. They have a pelagic stage to at least . They feed on small fishes and invertebrates.

Systematics
Malacanthus brevirostris was first formally described in 1848 by the French zoologist Alphonse Guichenot with the type locality given as Madagascar. The specific name is a compound of brevi meaning ”short” and rostris meaning “snout”, a reference to this species’ relatively short snout compared to its congeners.<ref name = ETYFish>{{cite web | url = https://etyfish.org/eupercaria/ | title =Series EUPERCARIA (Incertae sedis): Families CALLANTHIIDAE, CENTROGENYIDAE, DINOLESTIDAE, DINOPERCIDAE, EMMELICHTHYIDAE, MALACANTHIDAE, MONODACTYLIDAE, MORONIDAE, PARASCORPIDIDAE, SCIAENIDAE and SILLAGINIDAE | work = The ETYFish Project Fish Name Etymology Database | accessdate = 18 March 2021 | date = 18 September 2020 | author1 = Christopher Scharpf | author2 = Kenneth J. Lazara | name-list-style = amp | publisher = Christopher Scharpf and Kenneth J. Lazara}}</ref>

UtlilisationMalacanthus brevirostris is taken by spearfishing, hook-and-line, and traps. It is found in marketsthroughout its range, albeit infrequently, and may be marketed fresh or preserved by salting. It is rare in the aquarium trade.

Bibliography
Dooley, J.K. (1978) Systematics and biology of the tilefishes (Perciformes: Branchiostegidae and Malacanthidae) with descriptions of two new species., NOAA Tech. Rep. NMFS Circ. No. 411:1-78. 
Fricke, R. (1999) Fishes of the Mascarene Islands (Réunion, Mauritius, Rodriguez): an annotated checklist, with descriptions of new species., Koeltz Scientific Books, Koenigstein, Theses Zoologicae, Vol. 31:759 p.
 The Reef Guide: Fishes, corals, nudibranchs & other invertebrates: East & South Coasts of Southern Africa.'' Dennis King & Valda Fraser. Struik Nature. 2014

References

External links

 

brevirostris
Fish of the Indian Ocean
Fish of the Pacific Ocean
Fish described in 1848
Taxa named by Alphonse Guichenot